Walter Chew Flower (1850-1900) was the 44th Mayor of New Orleans (April 27, 1896 – May 7, 1900). He was one of the participants and killers in the March 14, 1891 New Orleans lynchings of 11 Italian immigrants.

References

Mayors of New Orleans
1850 births
1900 deaths